Zinc finger protein ZFPM1 (FOG-1) also known as friend of GATA protein 1  is a protein that in humans is encoded by the ZFPM1 gene.
It is a cofactor of the GATA1 transcription factor.

References

Further reading